BBYO UK & Ireland is a part of BBYO, a peer-led, Zionist youth movement. It is open to Jewish youth between the ages of 13–18 who want to take part in its activities. The members form local chapters, of which 3 are situated in the United Kingdom and Ireland, formerly BBYO District 15. The members are encouraged to play an active role in both the Jewish and general community. Globally BBYO reaches over 80,000 Jewish teens.

History

In 1923, a group of Jewish boys in Omaha, Nebraska organised their own fraternity after they had been refused entry to local fraternities that often excluded Jews. After a few months, a second chapter was founded in Kansas City. Thanks to the vision of adviser Sam Beber, who dreamt of a global Jewish movement, on May 3, 1924, a meeting took place and the Grand Order of the Aleph Zadik Aleph was born. The organisation rapidly began to grow and by April 1925 there were 7 chapters. Sam Beber approached the B'nai B'rith National Convention for support and AZA was adopted as B'nai B'rith primary youth programme. At the same time, small sororities began to spring up across North America, some using the B'nai B'rith Girls name. It was not until 1944 that, under the leadership of Anita Perlman, BBG was officially established as an international Order, and recognised by B'nai B'rith. The B'nai B'rith Youth Organisation was officially born.

In March 1940, Louis E Wigoder, an American living in Leeds founded Pioneer AZA #481. BBYO's first chapter in the United Kingdom. In June 1940, a similar story unfolded in Ireland, as an AZA chapter was founded in Dublin by American M. Gordon. In October 1943, Centenary AZA was established in Birmingham thanks to the hard work of American soldier Private William Katz and by 1944, further AZA chapters had been established in London. 1944 was also an important year for BBG as its first chapters opened in Leeds and Birmingham. By 1949, more chapters had been founded. BBYO was now big enough in the UK and Ireland to hold its first ever National Convention, in Hull. Hans Blanc was elected to lead the first National Executive, as the first National President, of BBYO District 15. BBYO District 15 continued to grow from strength to strength and sent its first members to AZA and BBG International Conventions, in 1955 and 1956 respectively. By 1966, the AZA and BBG chapters had become joint BBYO chapters and BBYO District 15 had grown enough to need an office and its first ever member of staff. Janet Ross worked as BBYO's first National Director from Hillel House in London. In 1973, members from London, Hull, Manchester, Coventry and Nottingham chapters took part in BBYO's first ever Israel tour. In 1981, Steven Kron from Dublin, became the first BBYO member from the UK & Ireland to hold a position on the International Board, as the Grand Aleph Shaliach. In the 1990s, BBYO began to become more independent from B'nai B'rith. In 1997, BBYO officially became a Zionist movement, passing a motion at National Convention, and the ideologies took the format that we know today. In 2002, BBYO in North America became independent from B'nai B'rith and reformed as BBYO, Inc. Over the course of the next decade, BBYO District 15 became known as BBYO UK & Ireland, in line with BBYO across the rest of the world. 2002 also saw the first summer camp take place in the UK and in 2003, it was given the Hebrew name Shorashim, meaning 'roots'. In 2008, after over 40 years at Hillel House BBYO moved into its own office in Hendon. In 2014, BBYO UK & Ireland signed a historic partnership agreement with BBYO Inc formalising our partnership and cementing our place as part of the global BBYO family.

Operation 

The whole district of UK & Ireland is led by the National Executive (team of six) which is elected by the members at an annual event called National Veida. The National Executive is made up of people usually aged 15–17. The National Executive supports the chapters as well as runs national events for the members.

BBYO UKI also has a Executive Director, a Head of Programmes, and a Programme Coordinator who make up the professional team to support the National Exec. BBYO "elders" (bogrim) make up the Youth Commission and they support the chapters and the National Exec in an advisory role.

BBYO runs a number of events national events through the year. A national event means that it is open to all chapters.

Chapters

The chapters typically hold their meetings every Sunday in the evening. The chapters have their own individual identity; the activities and programmes vary between chapters.

The three active chapters in the United Kingdom and Ireland are (as of 2020): Borehamwood (Kehilah), Edgware (Deganya), Watford (Gesher) and JW3, North London (Mercaz). They are all either in or very close to London.

The following chapters are inactive: Barnet (Masada, inactive in 2017), Birmingham, Bournemouth, Bushey (Sababa, inactive in 2018, formerly located in and called Pinner), Dublin (inactive in 2019), Manchester (inactive in 2019), Nottingham (Yoni, inactive in 2017).

Despite chapters no longer being active in Manchester and Ireland, members from these areas still attend national events and camps.

Executive Board Positions

In the UK and Ireland each chapter has up to six executive board members. These are the members that are in charge of running the programmes and looking after all the other members in that chapter. As BBYO is peer-led the executive positions are taken up by the older members of the group, usually aged between 15–17. There is also a national executive board that is in charge of all the different executive positions e.g. the national president is in charge of all the presidents of the different chapters. The next national executive board is voted in half way through the current national executive's terms. As of September 2020, only president, vice-president and programmer are offered to Mercaz and Watford. There are six positions with different roles and jobs to do, as follows:

Events

References

External links

Official websites
Official UK & Ireland Website
Official BBYO Website

Official social networking sites
BBYO Facebook Group
Twitter Group
Kehilah Chapter Page

Other
Tour 2008 Photos/Images

B'nai B'rith
Child-related organisations in the United Kingdom
Jewish youth organizations
Organisations based in the London Borough of Barnet
Youth-led organizations

he:נוער לנוער